Roebuck v NUM (Yorkshire Area) No 2 [1978] ICR 676 is a UK labour law case, concerning trade union regulation.

Facts
Union members gave evidence for the Sheffield Star in a libel action by Mr Arthur Scargill. They were disciplined by their union under its rules, prompted by Mr Scargill who chaired the disciplinary panel. They were found in breach and disqualified from office for two years.

Judgment
Templeman J held that the disciplinaries were unlawful. He noted that "all members of a domestic tribunal where the interests of their own organisation are at stake, have a general inclination to defend the union and its officers against attack from any source." Scargill's role as chairman "undoubtedly gave the impression that the dice were loaded against... the appearance of bias was inevitable." The question is "whether a reasonable man with no inside knowledge might well think that it might be biased." Here it was obvious.

See also

UK labour law

Notes

References

United Kingdom labour case law